Acacia auripila, commonly known as the Rudall River myall, is a tree of the genus Acacia and the subgenus Plurinerves that is native to a small area in central Western Australia.

Description
It has fissured grey coloured bark and slightly ribbed and glabrescent branchlets. Like most species of Acacia it has phyllodes rather than true leaves. It produces yellow flowers in August.

Taxonomy
The species was first formally described by the botanists Richard Sumner Cowan and Bruce Maslin in 1999 as part of the work Acacia miscellany. Miscellaneous new taxa and lectotypifications in Western Australian Acacia, mostly section Plurinerves (Leguminosae: Mimosoideae) as published in the journal Nuytsia. It was reclassified as Racosperma auripilum in 2003 by Leslie Pedley then transferred back to genus Acacia in 2006.

Distribution
It is native to an area in the eastern Pilbara region of Western Australia where it found on hillsides and gullies. Its distribution is limited to the Rudall River National Park as a part of spinifex communities growing in quartz gravel soils.

See also
 List of Acacia species

References

auripila
Acacias of Western Australia
Plants described in 1999
Taxa named by Bruce Maslin
Taxa named by Richard Sumner Cowan